The Price of Victory is a 1942 short propaganda film produced by Paramount Pictures and the U.S. Office of War Information. It was nominated for an Academy Award for Best Documentary Feature in 1943.

See also 
 List of Allied propaganda films of World War II

References

External links 
 
 The Price of Victory on the Indiana University Libraries Moving Image Archive
 The Price of Victory at the National Archives and Records Administration

1942 films
1940s war films
American World War II propaganda shorts
American black-and-white films
American war films
American short documentary films
1940s short documentary films
Films directed by William H. Pine
1940s American films